Leonid Aleksandrovich Reshetnikov (born 30 May 1986) is a Russian former professional football player.

Club career
He made his Russian Football National League debut for FC Neftekhimik Nizhnekamsk on 11 July 2016 in a game against FC Yenisey Krasnoyarsk.

External links
 Career summary by sportbox.ru
 

1986 births
Living people
Russian footballers
Association football midfielders
FC Tekstilshchik Kamyshin players
FC Khimki players
FC Chernomorets Novorossiysk players
FC Taganrog players
FC Mordovia Saransk players
FC Rotor Volgograd players
FC Neftekhimik Nizhnekamsk players
FC Chayka Peschanokopskoye players